Strubiny  is a village in the administrative district of Gmina Braniewo, within Braniewo County, Warmian-Masurian Voivodeship, in northern Poland, close to the border with the Kaliningrad Oblast of Russia.

The village has a population of 33.

References

Strubiny